Cluny or The Cluny may refer to:
The Cluny, a live music venue and pub in Newcastle upon Tyne, England
Cluny, a commune in the Saône-et-Loire department in the region of Bourgogne in eastern France
Cluny Abbey, a Benedictine monastery in Cluny, department of Saône-et-Loire, France